Victor William Kliesrath (May 27, 1880 – December 21, 1939) was vice president of Bendix Corporation and the inventor of the Bragg-Kliesrath brake with Caleb Bragg. They sold the company to Bendix Corporation in the late 1920s. In speedboat racing he won the APBA Challenge Cup race in Red Bank, NJ, in 1930 and Lake Montauk, NY, in 1931.

Life 
He was born on May 27, 1880 to Jacob Kliesrath and Ida Baumbach. He died on December 21, 1939 at his home in Flower Hill, New York, after a long battle with an illness.

References

1880 births
1939 deaths
Flower Hill, New York
American motorboat racers
APBA Challenge Cup
Bendix Corporation people